Entimini is a Neotropical weevil tribe in the subfamily Entiminae that includes 46 described species.

Most members of the tribe can be recognized by their relatively large and robust bodies. A key to identify the genera of Entimini can be found in Vanin & Gaiger. The Central American species are treated by Sharp & Champion,

Distribution 
The tribe ranges from Mexico to Argentina, with no representatives in the Caribbean islands. All genera are mainly represented in Brazil.

Genera 
Cydianerus – Cyriophthalmus – Entimus – Phaedropus – Polyteles – Rhigus – Trachyus

References 

 Schönherr, C.J. 1823: Curculionides [Tabula synoptica familiae Curculionidum]. Isis von Oken, 1823(10): 1132–1146. https://biodiversitylibrary.org/page/13257284

External links 

Entiminae